The 1993 Cincinnati Reds season was a season in American baseball. It consisted of the Cincinnati Reds attempting to win the National League West.

Offseason
 November 3, 1992: Paul O'Neill and Joe DeBerry (minors) were traded by the Reds to the New York Yankees for Roberto Kelly.
 November 6, 1992: Greg Cadaret was purchased by the Reds from the New York Yankees.
 November 17, 1992: Norm Charlton was traded by the Reds to the Seattle Mariners for Kevin Mitchell.
 November 18, 1992: Scott Coolbaugh was released by the Reds.
 November 25, 1992: Gary Varsho was selected off waivers by the Reds from the Pittsburgh Pirates.
 December 1, 1992: John Smiley was signed as a free agent by the Reds.
 December 7, 1992: Willie Cañate was drafted by the Reds from the Cleveland Indians in the 1992 rule 5 draft.
 December 10, 1992: Troy Afenir was signed as a free agent by the Reds.
 December 10, 1992: Jeff Kaiser was signed as a free agent by the Reds.
 December 11, 1992: Juan Samuel was signed as a free agent by the Reds.
 January 13, 1993: Bill Doran was purchased from the Reds by the Milwaukee Brewers.
 January 19, 1993: Jeff Reardon was signed as a free agent by the Reds.
 January 22, 1993: Jamie Quirk was signed as a free agent by the Reds.
 February 1, 1993: Randy Milligan was signed as a free agent by the Reds.
 Before 1993 season: Steve Carter was acquired by the Reds from the Detroit Tigers.

Regular season

Season standings

Record vs. opponents

Notable transactions
 April 13, 1993: Willie Cañate was purchased from the Reds by the Toronto Blue Jays.
 April 23, 1993: Jeff Kaiser was selected off waivers from the Reds by the New York Mets.
 June 28, 1993: Scott Service was selected off waivers from the Reds by the Colorado Rockies.
 July 7, 1993: Scott Service was selected off waivers by the Reds from the Colorado Rockies.
 July 12, 1991: Steve Carter was traded by the Reds to the Houston Astros for Jack Daugherty.
 July 26, 1993: Greg Cadaret was released by the Reds.
 July 31, 1993: Tim Belcher was traded by the Reds to the Chicago White Sox for Johnny Ruffin and Jeff Pierce.
 August 17, 1993: Randy Milligan was traded by the Reds to the Cleveland Indians for Thomas Howard.

Roster

Player stats

Batting

Starters by position
Note: Pos = Position; G = Games played; AB = At bats; H = Hits; Avg. = Batting average; HR = Home runs; RBI = Runs batted in

Other batters
Note: G = Games played; AB = At bats; H = Hits; Avg. = Batting average; HR = Home runs; RBI = Runs batted in

Pitching

Starting pitchers
Note: G = Games pitched; IP = Innings pitched; W = Wins; L = Losses; ERA = Earned run average; SO = Strikeouts

Other pitchers
Note: G = Games pitched; IP = Innings pitched; W = Wins; L = Losses; ERA = Earned run average; SO = Strikeouts

Relief pitchers
Note: G = Games pitched; W = Wins; L = Losses; SV = Saves; ERA = Earned run average; SO = Strikeouts

Awards and honors
 Barry Larkin, Shortstop, Roberto Clemente Award

Farm system 

LEAGUE CHAMPIONS: Winston-Salem, Billings

References

1993 Cincinnati Reds season at Baseball Reference
1993 Cincinnati Reds at Baseball Almanac

Cincinnati Reds seasons
Cincinnati Reds season
Cincinnati Reds